The 1997 Sta. Lucia Realtors season was the fifth season of the franchise in the Philippine Basketball Association (PBA).

Draft picks

Notable dates
July 22: Sta.Lucia advance in the Commissioners Cup semifinals with a 100-92 overtime victory over Purefoods Cowboys. Kenny Redfield, the two-time best import who led Shell to the finals last season and playing with his fourth team with the Realtors, scored his 27th triple-double performance of 34 points, 18 rebounds and 12 assists. With the victory, Sta.Lucia are tied on top of the standings with three other teams, San Miguel, Shell and Gordon's Gin with six wins and four losses.  

September 28: Import Sean Green carried the Realtors with his team-high 35 points as Sta.Lucia scored their third straight victory and a solo lead in the Governors Cup with a 111-90 rout off Pop Cola.

Occurrences
After a four-year coaching stint with the Purefoods ballclub, coach Chot Reyes accepted the offer of Sta.Lucia as their new head coach at the beginning of the season.

During the Governors Cup, after Sta.Lucia lost to Alaska by one point on October 28,  coach Chot Reyes resigned a few days later and gave up his position to assistant coach Adonis Tierra, who will handle the Realtors on interim basis. Reports had it that Reyes' temperaments have cause him his job at Sta.Lucia and the players' boycott against their coach led to his departure.

Roster

Transactions

Trades

Additions

Recruited imports

References

Sta. Lucia
Sta. Lucia Realtors seasons